Oktober Guitars Inc. (formerly October Guitars) was an American manufacturer of guitars and other instruments, based in Baltimore, Maryland. The company was founded by Tony Leicht, who was also the head luthier.

Previously named "October Guitars", it had no affiliation with the music store of the same name in Wisconsin. October Guitars Inc.|  under the name of "Oktober Guitars".

Oktober Guitars makes custom hand crafted instruments and is described as "a company started for musicians by musicians".

The company specialized in custom made instruments, especially guitars and bass guitars with distinct designs (provided by musicians) often released in "signature" editions.

Tony Leicht has collaborated with different bands and artists such as Mark Gallagher of British band Raven and Doyle Wolfgang von Frankenstein (former lead guitarist of the Misfits and currently playing with his own band Doyle) to replicate guitar models as they were originally designed.

In late 2016, Oktober Guitars sold the company to a larger, more well-known guitar manufacturer, and officially closed Oktober Guitars in 2017.

Models and series 
 "The Wraith" guitar
 "The Wrath of Wraiths" guitar
 "The Prophet" guitar
 "The MGT" (a "tele" guitar, designed by Mark Gallagher, guitarist for Raven)
 "The Raven", series of 12-string bass (designed by John Gallagher, bassist for Raven)
 "The Annihilator" guitar (from the "Von Frankenstein Series", designed by Doyle Wolfgang von Frankenstein).
 "The DevilWing" bass (from the "Von Frankenstein Series", designed by Doyle Wolfgang von Frankenstein).

References

External links 
 Official website of Oktober Guitars

Guitar manufacturing companies of the United States
Bass guitar manufacturing companies
Manufacturing companies based in Maryland
American companies established in 2011
Manufacturing companies established in 2011
2011 establishments in Maryland